I & I may refer to:

An expression in Iyaric, a dialect of English
Eye & I, a 1997 album by Kardinal Offishall